The 1972–73 season was Fussball Club Basel 1893's 79th season in their existence. It was their 27th consecutive season in the top flight of Swiss football after their promotion the season 1945–46. They played their home games in the St. Jakob Stadium. Félix Musfeld was the club's chairman for the third year in a row.

Overview

Pre-season
The previous season was the last one as activ footballer for Helmut Benthaus. He ended his playing career, but continued with Basel as team manager. This was his eighth season as manager. There were only small amendments to the squad during the pre-season. Roland Paolucci was loaned out to Winterthur and Stefan Reisch left the team and moved on to Kickers Würzburg where he ended his active playing career. Basel did not transfer any players and Benthaus relied on young players who came up from the reserve team to help, when needed in the first team. Basel played a total of 55 matches during this season. 26 of these games were in the domestic league championship, seven of these games were in the Swiss Cup, four in the Swiss League Cup, two were in the European Cup, four were in the Cup of the Alps and 12 were friendly matches. Of these 12 test games four were won, four were drawn and four were lost. Three test matches were played at home in the St. Jakob Stadium and nine were played away.

Domestic league
14 teams contested in the 1972–73 Nationalliga A. These were the top 12 teams from the previous 1971–72 season and the two newly promoted teams Chiasso and Fribourg. The championship was played in a double round robin. The champions would qualify for the 1973–74 European Cup, the second and third placed teams were to qualify for 1973–74 UEFA Cup and the last two teams in the table at the end of the season were to be relegated. Basel started the league season badly, losing the first two games and drawing the next two. The first victory was recorded in the fifth round and during the next nine rounds Basel won eight games. After the winter break Basel were only defeated once. They won the championship four points ahead of Grasshopper Club and six ahead of the Sion. Basel won 17 of their 26 league games, drew five and lost four. They scored a total of 57 goals conceding 30. Ottmar Hitzfeld was the league's joint top goal scorer with Ove Grahn of Lausanne-Sports both with 18 league goals. Basels second top scorer was Walter Balmer who managed 11 league goals. The average attendance at the 13 league home matches was 13'153 spectators. The highest attendance was 28,000 on 14 April in the game against Grasshopper Club and the second highest attendance was 26,000 on 2 May against Zürich.

Swiss Cup and League Cup
In the Swiss Cup Basel played the round of 32 on 5 November 1972 at home to Martigny-Sports in the St. Jakob Stadium. The round of 16 match on 26 November 1972 was played away against BSC Young Boys and Basel left the Wankdorf Stadium with a 4–0 victory. The quarter-finals were two legged fixtures, the first leg played on 10 December 1972 in Stadio Comunale was won 2–0 against Chiasso and the second leg played one week later was won 5–3. The semi-finals were also two legged fixtures. Basel were matched against Biel-Bienne and won 6–1 on aggregate. Walter Balmer scored a hattrick in the home game. The final was played on 23 April 1973 in the Wankdorf Stadium against Zürich. The game ended goalless after 90 minutes. In extra time Peter Marti (92) and Fritz Künzli (101) scored the goals to give Zürich the title for the second consecutive time in a final against Basel.

The 1972 Swiss League Cup was the inaugural Swiss League Cup competition. It was played in the summer of 1972 as a pre-season tournament to the 1972–73 Swiss football season. Basel beat Servette 8–0, Lausanne Sports 2–1 aet and Sion 6–1 to reach the final. This was won by Basel who defeated FC Winterthur 4–1 in the final which took place on 11 November 1972 at the Letzigrund in Zürich. Ottmar Hitzfeld scored a hattrick in the final.

European Cup and Cup of the Alps
Basel were beaten by Újpesti Dózsa 2–0 in the first leg of the first round of the 1972–73 European Cup away from home in the Ferenc Szusza Stadium. The return match was on 27 September 1972 in St. Jakob Stadium. Basel won 3–2, the goals coming from René Hasler (65) and Walter Balmer (75 + 83), but they were beaten 4–3 on aggregate.

In the 1972 Cup of the Alps Basel played twice against Olympique Lyonnais, losing the away tie, winning at home game. They played twice against Bordeaux, winning the away game but losing the home game, but because Bordeaux won their other two games they continued to the final.

Players 

 
 
 
 

 
 

 
 

 

 
 
 
 
 
 
 
 

Players who left the squad

Results 
Legend

Friendly matches

Pre- and Mid-season

Winter break

Nationalliga

League matches

League standings

Swiss Cup

Swiss League Cup

European Cup

First round

Újpesti Dózsa won 4–3 on aggregate.

Cup of the Alps

Matches

Group B league table

See also
 History of FC Basel
 List of FC Basel players
 List of FC Basel seasons

References

Sources 
 Rotblau: Jahrbuch Saison 2015/2016. Publisher: FC Basel Marketing AG. 
 Die ersten 125 Jahre. Publisher: Josef Zindel im Friedrich Reinhardt Verlag, Basel. 
 Verein "Basler Fussballarchiv" Homepage
 Switzerland 1972–73 at RSSSF
 Swiss League Cup 1972 at RSSSF
 Cup of the Alps 1972 at RSSSF

External links
 FC Basel official site

FC Basel seasons
Basel
1972-73